Angelo Sacco (died 1529) was a Roman Catholic prelate who served as Bishop of Alife (1504–1529).

Biography
On 15 Apr 1504, Angelo Sacco was appointed during the papacy of Pope Julius II as Bishop of Alife.
He served as Bishop of Alife until his death in 1529.

References

External links and additional sources
 (for Chronology of Bishops) 
 (for Chronology of Bishops) 

16th-century Italian Roman Catholic bishops
Bishops appointed by Pope Julius II
1529 deaths